The Deshbhakti Ke Pavan Teerth (Hindi: "देशभक्ति के पावन तीर्थ"), was written by Rishi Raj in the Hindi language and published by Prabhat Prakashan, in the year 2017. This book was inaugurated on 14 January 2017 in the New Delhi World Book Fair, hosted at Pragati Maidan, New Delhi by Yogendra Singh Yadav, Param Vir Chakra recipient, Baldev Bhai Sharma, then chairman of National Book Trust, Sharat Sharma, then Director Operations of Delhi Metro Rail Corporation, and Tripta Thapar, mother of martyr Captain Vijayant Thapar, Vir Chakra recipient. The Ministry of Tourism, (India), Government of India, has awarded 'Rahul Sankrityayan Award' for the year 2018–19 to this book.

The author has met several families of the martyrs, warriors and freedom fighters associated with the freedom movements and various wars fought by India with Pakistan and China in 1947, 1962, 1965, 1971 and Kargil War. He has travelled to the places where such freedom struggles and wars happened in the Indian history and has paid homage to them in a unique way by visiting the associated places and has urged all Indian to take out time and do the same and has also requested our young generation to never forget the sacrifices made by our freedom fighters and soldiers. This travelogue describes the incidents and the facts which have occurred in history beginning from the revolt of 1857 against the Britishers and has also described the places related to 1947, 1962, 1965, 1971 and Kargil war fought in the year 1999 in a fascinating manner. Special chapters related to Jallianwala Bagh and Cellular Jail (Port Blair) have also been added. The author has shared his travelling experiences with readers and amalgamated them with the historical events of the history of India in an interesting way that compels readers to visit such places beginning from Siachen Base Camp in Ladakh, Kashmir and ending in Andaman Nicobar. Through this book, one can comprehend the history of India while travelling through India and understand the cost of freedom as well.

The English version of the book Patriotic Pilgrimage Of India (English translation of the Book was published by Prabhat Prakashan, Prabhat Paperbacks, in the year 2018 is also available in the market. This book was launched at the Constitution Club of India on 9 February 2018 and inaugurated by Dr Mahesh Sharma, Dr Harsh Vardhan, Padma Bhushan Major H P S Ahluwalia and Subedar Major Yogendra Singh Yadav.

The author has so far written 9 books and 8 illustrations for children. Also, he has published many kindle editions related to various subjects and is an ardent traveller also and through his YouTube channel and other social media accounts have been spreading his experiences with everyone.

References

External links 
 An interview session organized by Central Secretariat Library, under Ministry of Culture, Government of India through: “Meet the Author” event on the book "Deshbhakti ke Pavan Teerth"
 Review of the book by the Dainik Tribune, The Tribune
 Samay Patrika's link on the book Deshbhakti Ke Pavan teerth
 Youtube link of the book launch function
 Youtube link of the author's channel: Exploring India with Rishi
 Google Book Link: Deshbhakti Ke Pavan Teerth
 Amazon Link: Deshbhakti Ke Pavan Teerth
 Flipkart link: Deshbhakti Ke Pavan Teerth
 Kapot link: Deshbhakti ke Pavan Teerth
 Exotic India Art Link: Deshbhakti ke Pavan Teerth
 AbeBooks Links: Deshbhakti ke Pavan Teerth along with rest of the books written by the author are available here
 Prabhat Prakashan

2017 Indian novels
Hindi-language novels
Novels set in India
Novels set in Delhi